Metenolone acetate, or methenolone acetate, sold under the brand names Primobolan and Nibal, is an androgen and anabolic steroid (AAS) medication which is used mainly in the treatment of anemia due to bone marrow failure. It is taken by mouth. Although it was widely used in the past, the drug has mostly been discontinued and hence is now mostly no longer available. A related drug, metenolone enanthate, is given by injection into muscle.

Side effects of metenolone acetate include symptoms of masculinization like acne, increased hair growth, voice changes, and increased sexual desire. The drug is a synthetic androgen and anabolic steroid and hence is an agonist of the androgen receptor (AR), the biological target of androgens like testosterone and dihydrotestosterone (DHT). It has moderate anabolic effects and weak androgenic effects, as well as no estrogenic effects or risk of liver damage. Metenolone enanthate is a metenolone ester and a prodrug of metenolone in the body.

Metenolone acetate was introduced for medical use in 1961. In addition to its medical use, metenolone acetate is used to improve physique and performance. The drug is a controlled substance in many countries and so non-medical use is generally illicit. It remains marketed for medical use only in a few countries, such as Japan and Moldova.

Side effects

Pharmacology

Chemistry

Metenolone acetate, or metenolone 17β-acetate, is a synthetic androstane steroid and a derivative of DHT. It is the C17β acetate ester of metenolone, which itself is 1-methyl-δ1-4,5α-dihydrotestosterone (1-methyl-δ1-DHT) or 1-methyl-5α-androst-1-en-17β-ol-3-one.

History
Metenolone acetate was first introduced for medical use in West Germany in 1961 under the brand name Primobolan and in the United States in 1962.

Society and culture

Generic names

Brand names
Metenolone acetate is or has been marketed under a number of brand names including Primobolan, Primobolan S, Primonabol, and Nibal.

Availability
Metenolone acetate is marketed in Japan and Moldova.

References

External links

Acetate esters
Androgen esters
Androgens and anabolic steroids
Androstanes
Enones
Prodrugs
World Anti-Doping Agency prohibited substances